Canyon Hills High School is a public high school situated in the community of Tierrasanta within the city of San Diego, California. Previously known as Junipero Serra High School, it was named for Junípero Serra, a Spanish missionary who founded Mission San Diego and other settlements in what is now California. It is a traditional school in the San Diego Unified School District and is the high school for students from Tierrasanta and the adjacent Murphy Canyon military housing community. On March 9, 2021, the San Diego Unified School Board voted to change the name of the school to Canyon Hills High School.

History 
In December 2000, a 15 year old student brought a gun to school and threatened to shoot a classmate. He ended up accidentally shooting himself before carrying out that threat.

Mascot 
The school mascot was Conrad the Conquistador. Following the murder of George Floyd in 2020, students started a petition to change the mascot from a conquistador, a symbol they said represented Spanish colonialism and its impact on the indigenous population. Principal Erica Renfree encouraged the change, and suggested also changing the school's name to Tierrasanta High School. Virtual town halls were scheduled to discuss the changes. On March 9, 2021, the San Diego Unified School Board voted to change the name of the school to Canyon Hills High School, as well as the mascot to the Rattlers.

Athletics programs

In the 1999-2000 season the Boys Varsity Basketball won their first Section 2 Championship in school history and their third straight Eastern League Title. In the 2011-2012 season, the girls Basketball team won San Diego CIF by defeating West Hills High School. Varsity Girls Soccer also won a CIF Div. 2 Championship in 2013. As of 2014, they are in the City League.

Rivalry
Canyon Hills High School's rival is Patrick Henry High School. The Field Hockey team, however, is most known for having a rivalry with  Scripps Ranch High School which is located in the Scripps Ranch community of San Diego.

School activities and clubs

References

External links 

 Official Homepage

High schools in San Diego
Public high schools in California
Educational institutions established in 1976
1976 establishments in California